Thomas or Tom Russo may refer to:

Thomas A. Russo (born 1943), American lawyer, professor, and author
Thom Russo (born 1969), American record producer
Dr. Tom Russo, character in In the Flesh
Tom Russo, editor of Next Generation
Tom Russo, character in Killing Spree
Tom Russo, UIC Flames men's basketball